The Zhelon is a river in Zhytomyr Oblast, Ukraine and Gomel Region, Belarus.

External links 
 

Rivers of Zhytomyr Oblast
Rivers of Gomel Region
Rivers of Belarus